On the Road or Take the Road (French: Prends la route) is a 1936 French musical comedy film directed by Jean Boyer and starring Jacques Pills, Claude May, and Georges Tabet. The same lead actors had also appeared together in You Are Me.

It was produced by the French subsidiary of the German company UFA.

Main cast
 Jacques Pills as Jacques
 Claude May as Simone
 Georges Tabet as Potopoto, le motocycliste et agent d'assurance
 André Alerme as Dupont-Dernier, l'indistriel 
  as le comte
 Lucien Callamand as le gendarme
 Colette Darfeuil as Wanda, l'aventurière
 Monette Dinay as la secrétaire de Potopoto
 Jeanne Loury as Tante Guiguitte

References

Bibliography 
 Dayna Oscherwitz & MaryEllen Higgins. The A to Z of French Cinema. Scarecrow Press, 2009.

External links 
 

1936 films
French musical comedy films
1936 musical comedy films
1930s French-language films
Films directed by Jean Boyer
Operetta films
French black-and-white films
1930s French films